Margarita Cano may refer to:

 Margarita Cano (artist) (born 1932), Cuban-American artist
 Margarita Cano (politician) (born 1953), Mexican politician